A dust devil is a strong, well-formed, and relatively long-lived whirlwind.

Dust devil may also refer to:

Music
 Dustdevils, an American noise rock band
 "Dust Devil" (song), a 2009 song by Madness
 "Dust Devil", a song by Butthole Surfers from Independent Worm Saloon
 "Dust Devil", a song by Muzzy
 "Dust Devil", a song by School of Seven Bells from Disconnect from Desire

Other uses
 Dust Devil (film), a 1992 horror film by Richard Stanley
 Dust Devils (game), a 2002 role-playing game set in the American Old West
 Tri-City Dust Devils, an American minor-league baseball team in Pasco, Washington
 Dust Devil, a member of the Blasters in the DC Comics universe
 Dust Devil, Australian musician and composer of the original theme music for the Cartoon Network programming block Adult Swim